The 2017 Men's European Volleyball Championship was the 30th edition of the Men's European Volleyball Championship, organised by Europe's governing volleyball body, the CEV. The tournament was held in Poland between 24 August and 3 September.

Russia defeated Germany in the final to capture a record 14th title in the tournament. Serbia defeated Belgium for the bronze medal. Maxim Mikhaylov from Russia was elected the MVP.

Qualification

Pools composition

Squads

Venues

Opening 
A spine tingling Opening Ceremony including show acts, live music and fireworks attended by an all-time record-breaking crowd set the tone for a historic night at PGE National Stadium in Warsaw. The fans virtually travelled to what the organisers have christened Volleyplanet as more than 1,600 people took part in the Opening Ceremony of EuroVolley 2017. Two bands, one popular duo, and as many as 180 dancers, 120 adults and 60 children, performed live to deliver something truly unprecedented in European Volleyball history.
It was a tribute to Poland, but especially to Volleyball as more than 65,000 people all dressed in their white-and-red outfits celebrated the sport, thus confirming the status of Poland as Volleyland.

Pool standing procedure
 Number of matches won
 Match points
 Sets ratio
 Points ratio
 Result of the last match between the tied teams

Match won 3–0 or 3–1: 3 match points for the winner, 0 match points for the loser
Match won 3–2: 2 match points for the winner, 1 match point for the loser

Preliminary round
All times are local Central European Summer Time (UTC+2).

Pool A

Pool B

Pool C

Pool D

Championship round

Bracket

Playoffs

Quarterfinals

Semifinals

Third place game

Final

Final standing

Awards

Most Valuable Player
  Maxim Mikhaylov
Best Setter
  Sergey Grankin
Best Outside Spikers
  Denis Kaliberda
  Dmitry Volkov
Best Middle Blockers
  Srećko Lisinac
  Marcus Böhme
Best Opposite Spiker
  György Grozer
Best Libero
  Lowie Stuer

See also
2017 Women's European Volleyball Championship

References

External links
Official website

2017
2017 Men's European Volleyball Championship
Men's European Volleyball Championship
European Volleyball Championship
Sports competitions in Gdańsk
Sport in Sopot
Sport in Szczecin
Sports competitions in Katowice
Sports competitions in Kraków
August 2017 sports events in Europe
September 2017 sports events in Europe
21st century in Kraków
21st century in Katowice
2010s in Warsaw
Sports competitions in Warsaw
21st century in Gdańsk